Reetinder Singh Sodhi  (born 18 October 1980) is a former Indian cricketer. He was an all-rounder from Punjab, was one of the options that Indian selectors had while looking for a quality players, who can bowl and bat. He was the key member of India's first under 19 world cup winning team Sodhi made his One Day International debut against Zimbabwe at Cuttack in December 2000.

Career 
He was selected in 2000 for the first intake of the National Cricket Academy in Bangalore. 
Reetinder Singh Sodhi was the captain in India's U-15 World Cup win, and later on was vice-captain in India's U-19 World Cup win.
Sodhi was included in the Indian One Day International squad in December 2000, and after his rapid rise into the national team at a young age, he was regarded as a long-term international prospect. He had also played for Ahmedabad Rockets in the Indian Cricket League.

However he was dropped soon after and has ceased to be among the front-runners for Indian selection. He now works as a match referee in first class cricket.

References

External links

1980 births
Living people
Punjab, India cricketers
Punjab Kings cricketers
India One Day International cricketers
Cricketers from Patiala
North Zone cricketers
Ahmedabad Rockets cricketers